The 2007 FIBA Asia Championship qualification was held in early 2007 with the Gulf region, West Asia, Southeast Asia, East Asia and Middle Asia (Central Asia and South Asia) each conducting tournaments.

Qualification format
The following are eligible to participate:

 The organizing country.
 The champion team from the previous FIBA Asia Stanković Cup.
 The four best-placed teams from the previous FIBA Asia Stanković Cup will qualify the same number of teams from their respective sub-zones.
 The two best teams from the sub-zones.

FIBA Asia Stanković Cup

After the cancellation of 2006 FIBA Asia Stanković Cup which was supposed to be held in Damascus, Syria between 20th to 29th of July, The final ranking of the 2005 FIBA Asia Championship was counted instead.

Qualified teams

* With Saudi Arabia's withdrawal,  qualified in their place.

East Asia
All the others withdrew, so ,  and  qualified automatically.

Gulf
The 2006 Gulf Basketball Association Championship is the qualifying tournament for the 2007 FIBA Asia Championship.

Middle Asia
The Middle Asia Championship is the qualifying tournament for the 2007 FIBA Asia Championship; it also serves as a regional championship involving Central Asian and South Asian nations basketball teams. The teams in the final advance to the FIBA Asia Championship.

The tournament was held at Colombo, Sri Lanka.

Preliminary round

Final

Final standing

Southeast Asia

The 7th Southeast Asia Basketball Association Championship was the qualifying tournament for the 2007 FIBA Asia Championship; it also served as a regional championship involving Southeast Asian basketball teams. The two teams with the best records advances to the FIBA Asia Championship.

The local name of the tournament held in Ratchaburi, Thailand was  11th Crown Prince Cup International Invitational Basketball Tournament.

West Asia

References

External links 
 FIBA Asia official website
 2007 FIBA Asia Championship official website 

2007
qualification
SEABA Championship
Qual